Aliabad-e Abu ol Qasem Khani (also Romanized as ‘Alīābād-e Abū ol Qāsem Khānī; also known as ‘Alīābād-e Mīrzā Abū ol Qāsemī, ‘Aliābād, ‘Alīābād-e Kaleh ‘Omar, ‘Alīābād-e Kalleh ‘Omar, ‘Alīābād-e Mīrzā Abolqāsem Khānī, ‘Alīābād-e Qarā’ī, and Qarā’ī and Abū ol Qāsem Khānī) is a village in Sharifabad Rural District, Sharifabad District of Pakdasht County, Tehran province, Iran.

At the 2006 National Census, its population was 1,238 in 313 households. The following census in 2011 counted 2,142 people in 581 households. The latest census in 2016 showed a population of 3,067 people in 831 households; it was the largest village in its rural district.

References 

Pakdasht County

Populated places in Tehran Province

Populated places in Pakdasht County